The Tokyo Metropolitan Government Board of Education (東京都教育委員会 Tōkyō-to Kyōiku Iinkai) is the board of education in Tokyo, Japan. The board directly manages all of the public high schools in all 23 special wards, the Western Tokyo, and all islands under Tokyo's jurisdiction.

In 2019, policies requiring students who do not naturally have black hair to dye it as such were struck down. In 2017, as stated by survey results, 57% of the state-operated schools in the metropolis required students who did not have hair naturally colored black to submit documents proving so. The Japanese Communist Party criticized measures requiring parents to prove hair color.

The 23 Wards

Adachi

High schools
 Aoi High School 
 Adachi High School 
 Adachi East High School 
 Adachi West High School 
 Adachi Shinden High School 
 Adachi Technical High School 
 Arakawa Commercial High School 
 Fuchie High School 
 Kohoku High School

Arakawa

High schools
 Arakawa Technical High School 
 Takenodai High School

Bunkyō

High schools
 Kogei High School 
 Koishikawa High School 
 Koishikawa Secondary Education School 
 Mukogaoka High School 
 Takehaya High School

Chiyoda

High schools

 Kudan Secondary Education School 
 Hibiya High School 
 Hitotsubashi High School

Chūō

High schools
 Harumi Sogo High School

Edogawa

High schools
 Edogawa High School 
 Kasai Technical High School 
 Kasai South High School 
 Koiwa High School 
 Komatsugawa High School 
 Momijigawa High School 
 Shinozaki High School

Itabashi

High schools
 Itabashi High School 
 Itabashi Yutoku High School 
 Kitatoshima Technical High School 
 Kitazono High School 
 Ohyama High School 
 Takashima High School

Katsushika

High schools
 Katsushika Commercial High School 
 Katsushika Sogo High School 
 Katsushikano High School 
 Honjo Technical High School 
 South Katsushika High School 
 Nousan High School

Kita

High schools
 Asuka High School 
 Akabane Commercial High School 
 Kirigaoka High School

Koto

High schools
 Daisan Commercial High School 
 Fukagawa High School 
 Higashi High School 
 High School of Science and Technology 
 Johtoh High School 
 Koto Commercial High School 
 Oedo High School 
 Sumida Technical High School

Meguro

High schools

 Geijutsu High School 
 International High School 
 Komaba High School 
 Meguro High School 
 Ohsyukan Secondary Education School 
 Tokyo Metropolitan University High School

Minato

High schools
 Mita High School 
 Ota Sakuradai High School 
 Roppongi High School 
 Shiba Commercial High School

Nakano

High schools
 Fuji High School 
 Minorigaoka High School 
 Musashigaoka High School 
 Nakano Technical High School 
 Saginomiya High School 
 Yotsuya Commercial High School

Nerima

High schools
 Fourth Commercial High School 
 Hikarigaoka High School 
 Igusa High School 
 Nerima High School 
 Nerima Technical High School 
 Oizumi High School 
 Oizumi Sakura High School 
 Shakujii High School 
 Tagara High School

Ōta

High schools

 Den-en Chofu High School 
 Kamata High School 
 Mihara High School 
 Omori High School 
 Rokugoh Technical High School 
 Tsubasa Sogo High School 
 Yukigaya High School

Setagaya

High schools
 Chitosegaoka High School 
 Engei High School 
 Fukasawa High School 
 Matsubara High School 
 Roka High School 
 Sakuramachi High School 
 Setagaya Izumi High School 
 Setagaya Sogo High School 
 Sogo Technical High School

Shibuya

High schools
 Aoyama High School 
 First Commercial High School 
 Hiroo High School

Shinagawa

High schools
 Koyamadai High School 
 Osaki High School 
 Yashio High School

Shinjuku

High schools
 Shinjuku High School 
 Shinjuku Yamabuki High School 
 Toyama High School

Suginami

High schools
 Nishi High School 
 Nogei High School 
 Ogikubo High School 
 Suginami High School 
 Suginami Sogo High School 
 Suginami Technical High School 
 Toyotama High School

Sumida

junior high schools
 Ryogoku Junior High School

High schools
 Honjo High School 
 Mukojima Commercial High School 
 Mukojima Technical High School 
 Nihonbashi High School 
 Ryogoku High School 
 Sumidagawa High School 
 Tachibana High School

Taitō

junior high schools
 Hakuo Junior High School

High schools
 Asakusa High School 
 Hakuo High School 
 Kuramae Technical High School 
 Shinobugaoka High School 
 Ueno High School

Toshima

High schools
 Bunkyo High School 
 Chihaya High School 
 Toshima High School

Western Tokyo (incorporated cities)

Akiruno

High schools
 Akirudai High School 
 Itsukaichi High School

Akishima

High schools
 Haijima High School 
 Showa High School

Chōfu

High schools
 Chofu North High School 
 Chofu South High School 
 Jindai High School

Fuchū

High schools
 Fuchu High School 
 Fuchu East High School 
 Fuchu West High School 
 Fuchu Technical High School 
 Nogyo High School

Fussa

High schools
 Fussa High School 
 Tama Technical High School

Hachiōji

High schools
 Fujimori High School 
 Hachioji East High School 
 Hachioji North High School 
 Hachioji Takushin High School 
 Hachioji Technical High School 
 Katakura High School 
 Matsugaya High School 
 Minamitama High School 
 Second Commercial High School 
 Shoyo High School

Hamura

High schools
 Hamura High School

Higashikurume

High schools
 Kurume High School 
 Kurume West High School 
 Higashikurume Sogo High School

Higashimurayama

High schools
 Higashimurayama High School 
 Higashimurayama West High School

Higashiyamato

High schools
 Higashiyamato High School 
 Higashiyamato South High School

Hino

High schools
 Hino High School 
 Hinodai High School 
 Minamidaira High School

Inagi

High schools
 Wakaba Sogo High School

Kiyose

High schools
 Kiyose High School

Kodaira

High schools
 Kodaira High School 
 Kodaira South High School 
 Kodaira West High School

Koganei

High schools
 Koganei North High School 
 Koganei Technical High School

Kokubunji

High schools
 Kokubunji High School

Komae

High schools
 Komae High School

Kunitachi

High schools
 Kunitachi High School 
 Fifth Commercial High School

Machida

High schools
 Machida High School 
 Machida Technical High School 
 Naruse High School 
 Nozuta High School 
 Ogawa High School 
 Yamasaki High School

Mitaka

High schools
 Mitaka High School

Mushashimurayama

High schools
 Josui High School 
 Mushashimurayama High School

Musashino

junior high schools
 Musashi Junior High School

High schools
 Musashi High School 
 Musashino North High School

Nishitōkyō

High schools
 Hoya High School 
 Tanashi High School 
 Tanashi High School of Technology

Ōme

High schools
 Ome Sogo High School 
 Tama High School

Tachikawa

High schools
 Kitatama High School 
 Sunagawa High School 
 Tachikawa High School 
 Tachikawa International Secondary Education School

Tama

High schools
 Nagayama High School

Nishitama District

High schools

 Mizuho Nōgei High School (Mizuho)

Tokyo-Administered Islands

Hachijō

High schools
 Hachijō High School

Kōzu-shima

High schools
 Kozu High School

Miyakejima

High schools
 Miyake High School

Niijima

High schools
 Niijima High School

Ogasawara

High schools
 Chichijima
 Ogasawara High School

Izu Ōshima

High schools
 Oshima High School 
 Oshima Kaiyo-kokusai High School

Specialized schools

Technical schools

23 special wards
 Arakawa
 Tokyo Metropolitan College of Aeronautical Engineering EN, JP
 Shinagawa
 Tokyo Metropolitan College of Technology 
 Tokyo Metropolitan College of Industrial Technology

Schools for the blind

23 special wards
 Bunkyō
 Bunkyo School for the Blind 
 Katsushika
 Katsushika School for the Blind 
 Setagaya
 Kugayama School for the Blind

Western Tokyo (incorporated cities)
 Hachiōji
 Hachiōji School for the Blind

Schools for the deaf

23 special wards
 Central School for the Deaf (2 locations)  - Shakuji Campus (石神井校舎) in Nerima and Otsuka Campus (大塚校舎) in Toshima

See also

 Secondary education in Japan

References

External links
 Tokyo Metropolitan Government Board of Education (Japanese)
 Pages in English

Education in Tokyo
Government of Tokyo
Prefectural school systems in Japan